Buravet (formerly Persi) is an abandoned settlement in the Aragatsotn Province of Armenia.

See also 
Aragatsotn Province

References 

Former populated places in Aragatsotn Province